is a Japanese judoka. He competed in the men's half-heavyweight event at the 1992 Summer Olympics.

References

External links
 

1968 births
Living people
Japanese male judoka
Olympic judoka of Japan
Judoka at the 1992 Summer Olympics
Sportspeople from Fukuoka (city)
Asian Games medalists in judo
Judoka at the 1990 Asian Games
Asian Games gold medalists for Japan
Medalists at the 1990 Asian Games
20th-century Japanese people
21st-century Japanese people